The discography of British R&B and pop recording singer Alexandra Burke consists of three studio albums, ten singles as a main artist, two as a featured artist and nine music videos. All songs which have been released under the recording label of Sony BMG and Syco Music.

Alexandra made her debut in 2008 when she auditioned for British reality talent show, The X Factor during the fifth series, and ultimately won the show on 12 December 2008. During the series she dueted with Beyoncé Knowles on Knowles' "Listen". Due to winning the show, she won a record deal with Sony BMG and Syco Music and released her debut single, "Hallelujah". "Hallelujah" peaked at number-one on the UK Singles Chart and the Irish Singles Chart. The song became the current European record holder for single sales over a period of 24 hours, selling 105,000 copies in one day. It was also the top-selling song of the year in the UK, and became the 2008 UK Christmas number-one single. By January 2009, UK sales of Burke's version had passed one million copies, a first for a British female soloist. The music video for the song was directed by Max and Dania who directed the charity single Burke released with fellow X Factor Finalists 2008, "Hero" which also charted at number-one on the UK Singles Chart and Irish Singles Chart.

Burke returned in late 2009 with follow-up single, "Bad Boys" which featured vocals from American rapper, Flo Rida. She performed the song on the first live show of the sixth series of The X Factor. The R&B single debuted at number-one on the UK Singles Chart and Irish Singles Chart as well as Burke gaining international success with the single. "Bad Boys" went on to gain a Platinum certification and Burke was nominated for a BRIT Award, it was the second time Burke was nominated for the Best British Single, first time with "Hallelujah". In the UK, "Bad Boys" is the 18th biggest download of all time.

She released her debut album Overcome in October 2009. It was described as "edgy" and "beaty". The album was said to resemble the style of artists such as Rihanna or Lady Gaga. Upon the release of the album, the album went straight to number one on the UK Albums Chart selling 132,065 in its first week. Its first-week numbers were the fourth largest first-week sales by a female artist in 2009 behind releases by Susan Boyle, Lily Allen and Leona Lewis and was the twenty-second best-selling album of 2009, and the forty-third best-selling album of 2010. The album spent 60 weeks on the UK Albums Chart and has been certified double platinum by the British Phonographic Industry (BPI) for shipments over 600,000 copies. "Broken Heels" was released as the album third single and "All Night Long" featuring Pitbull as the fourth. "All Night Long" received a platinum certification and Burke was nominated for another BRIT Award in 2010. "Start Without You" was released in mid-2010 and the song went on to top the UK Singles Chart, and "The Silence" was released as the final single from the album.

Work began in 2011 on a second studio album, titled Heartbreak on Hold, which was released on 4 June 2012. The lead single, "Elephant"—featuring Erick Morillo—was released on 11 March 2012 through RCA Records, where it debuted at number three in the United Kingdom; marking Burke's sixth top ten single as a solo artist. A second single, "Let It Go" was released and peaked at number 33. The album then debuted and peaked at number 18.

Burke released her third studio album, The Truth Is, through Decca Records on 16 March 2018. It was preceded by lead single "Shadow".

Albums

Studio albums

Extended plays

Singles

As lead artist

Promotional singles

As featured artist

Other charted songs

Music videos

References

Discographies of British artists
Rhythm and blues discographies
Pop music discographies